The BT Centre was the global headquarters and registered office of BT Group, located in a 10-storey office building on Newgate Street in the City of London, London, England. It is opposite St Paul's tube station. It was completed in 1985. In 2019, BT sold the building and revealed plans to relocate their offices to 1 Braham Street near Aldgate East station. Their new headquarters was opened in November 2021.

A plaque on the outside of the building marks this as the location from which Guglielmo Marconi made the first public transmission of wireless signals, in 1897 while it was the Central Telegraph Office building of the General Post Office complex. The Telegraph Office building was originally built in 1874. It was damaged by a German bomb in 1917, and more severely damaged by bombing in 1940 when the interior was burned out; it reopened in 1943. By the 1950s, the volume of telegraph traffic had declined; the Telegraph Office closed in 1963, and was demolished in 1967. Following archaeological investigations by the Museum of London, planning permission was granted for the new building in 1979.

References

External links

Buildings and structures in the City of London
British Telecom buildings and structures
Telecommunications company headquarters in the United Kingdom
1897 establishments in the United Kingdom
Companies established in 1897